Manjari Chatterjee Miller is an Associate Professor of international relations at Boston University who specializes in narratives in rising powers, particularly China and India. She is a Senior Fellow at the Council on Foreign Relations in Washington D.C.

Early life and education
Miller received a BA from the University of Delhi in India and an MA from the University of London in the United Kingdom.

Miller received her PhD from Harvard University and completed a post-doctoral fellowship at Princeton University.

Notable work
In 2013, Miller published Wronged by Empire on the response to colonization in India and China.

In 2021, Miller published Why Nations Rise, which draws on the historical cases of the United States, Meiji Japan, the Netherlands, and Cold War Japan.  Miller focuses on the role of narratives in rising powers in the context of contemporary China and India.

References

21st-century Indian writers
Harvard University alumni
Boston University faculty
Living people
Year of birth missing (living people)
Delhi University alumni
Alumni of the University of London
Princeton University alumni